Ashagi Khalaj (also, Yenikənd, Bashirabat, Yenikend, Yetimlar, and Yetimlyar) is a village and municipality in the Salyan Rayon of Azerbaijan.  It has a population of 2,110. The village was renamed to Ashagi Khalaj by the decision of the Parliament of Azerbaijan on May 11, 2010.

References

External links

Populated places in Salyan District (Azerbaijan)